Zindagi Gulzar Hai is a Pakistani television series directed by Sultana Siddiqui, produced by Momina Duraid under banner Moomal Productions, which was first broadcast on Hum TV. Based on the novel of the same name by Umera Ahmad who also wrote the screenplay, it first telecast from 30 November 2012 to 24 May 2013 in Pakistan. The story revolves around two people, opposite in thoughts and financial status, and has a strong female protagonist, contributing to its popularity amongst women.

The virtuous story and unique creative concept of the show was initially loved by the audiences. It was viewed widely across the Indian subcontinent and majorly in Pakistan, India and Bangladesh. It is often considered one of the best Pakistani dramas of all times.

Plot 
The story revolves around the lives of Kashaf Murtaza and Zaroon Junaid. Kashaf comes from lower-middle-class family background and lives with her mother, Rafia and her two sisters, Sidra and Shehnila. Rafia's husband, Murtaza, had abandoned Rafia because she did not give birth to a son. Murtaza married another woman, who eventually gave birth to his son Hamad. The family faces many hardships, due to which Kashaf becomes bitter and insecure and distrusts men. Rafia works as the principal of a government school and gives tuition to children in the evening to make ends meet. Her daughters, too, make various sacrifices to live a basic life.

Zaroon Junaid's family consists of his father, Junaid, who is calm and mature. His mother, Ghazala Junaid, is an independent working mother. Zaroon's sister, Sara, has the same views about life as her mother. Zaroon's circle of close friends consists of Asmara and Osama. He remains unaware of the fact that Asmara is in love with him. Their families get them engaged, but they break off the engagement due to irreconcilable differences in their lifestyles. At the same time, his sister's marriage fails. Zaroon develops some notions about his ideal wife.

Kashaf gets a scholarship to a prestigious university. She meets Zaroon Junaid, who leads a life completely different from hers. He is a rich brat, and Kashaf hates him. Due to her mistrust of men and views about the class difference, she does not mix with other students. She and Zaroon don't get along, primarily due to Zaroon's flirtatious nature and jealousy of her out-performing him academically. Despite that, Zaroon tries to reconcile with her, but his attempts get repeatedly rebuffed. One day she overhears Zaroon saying that he was only trying to be friendly as a challenge and to trap Kashaf and tarnish her image. They have a massive fight in the library, and Kashaf starts hating him outright. Osama, Zaroon's best friend, admires Kashaf and defends her.

In the meantime, Shehnila gets admission to an engineering college. Sidra is married to a doctor and settles in the US. Zaroon and Kashaf appear for CSS exams and get admitted to Pakistan's Central Superior Services. Kashaf becoming a DMG officer changes her father's and extended family's thinking and behaviour. Zaroon and Kashaf meet in the line of duty, and he makes amends and attempts to be friendly with her, only to get turned down as always. Kashaf believes him to be the same flirtatious and arrogant man as before. Osama proposes to Kashaf, but she does not answer.

Shehnila is offered a marriage proposal from a good family, but Rafia wants her eldest daughter Kashaf to be married first. Sidra moves from the US to help her mother find a suitable match for Kashaf. She convinces Kashaf to agree to Osama's proposal, and Kashaf calls him to say yes, only to realise that he is getting married to someone else. Meanwhile, Zaroon talks to Sir Abrar, a close family friend who was the principal of the university where he and Kashaf studied. He is a mentor to Kashaf, and she respects and listens to him. Zaroon confesses that he wants to marry Kashaf and asks him to talk to Kashaf on his behalf. After initially rejecting his proposal, the two agree to meet at Abrar's house. Zaroon prevents Kashaf from getting scalded by hot tea and burns himself. Kashaf accepts Zaroon's proposal, and they get engaged and married. After the wedding, Zaroon establishes a good rapport with Kashaf's family.

Zaroon and Kashaf eventually become better acquainted and realise their differences, but Kashaf also falls in love with him. Kashaf overhears Zaroon's mother telling him he should not give Kashaf too much money. Kashaf feels hurt seeing her mother-in-law's approach towards her family. Later, Zaroon gets upset when Kashaf takes a loan for her mother's home without informing him, but they reconcile.

Later they have a massive fight about Kashaf hiding Osama's proposal, and they reconcile when they learn that Kashaf is pregnant. In due course, Kashaf discovers that Zaroon is secretly in touch with Asmara. Thinking that Zaroon is having a romantic affair with her, she leaves his house and returns to her mother's home. She starts missing Zaroon and dreams that Zaroon has divorced her. Zaroon also misses Kashaf but does not contact her. Kashaf realises that she is in love with Zaroon and yearns to return to him, but she doesn't call him either. When she realises that she has twin daughters, she is scared. She is afraid of having daughters as she knows how her mother had to pay for it. She calls up Zaroon in the middle of the night to tell him and expects him to be angry. But she is deeply relaxed when she realises that he is ecstatic. Zaroon flies the same night to meet her, and they reconcile. As their love triumphs, their mutual love and respect grow. Kashaf learns not to be so bitter, secretive and insecure. Zaroon learns not to be impulsive and judgemental. A few months later, Kashaf gives birth to twin girls.

Cast 
 Sanam Saeed as Kashaf Murtaza/ Kashaf Zaroon Junaid, Zaroon's wife, Murtaza & Rafiya's daughter 
 Fawad Khan as Zaroon Junaid, Kashaf's husband, Junaid and Ghazala's son
 Ayesha Omer as Sara Junaid: Zaroon's sister
 Mehreen Raheel as Asmara Tariq
 Sheheryar Munawar Siddiqui as Osama
 Mansha Pasha as Sidra Murtaza: Kashaf's younger sister
 Sana Sarfaraz as Shehnila Murtaza: Kashaf's younger sister
 Samina Peerzada as Rafiya Murtaza: Kashaf's mother
 Waseem Abbas as Murtaza: Kashaf's father
 Javed Shaikh as Junaid: Zaroon and Sara's father
 Hina Khawaja Bayat as Ghazala Junaid: Zaroon and Sara's mother
 Behroze Sabzwari as Abrar: Teacher and Zaroon's uncle
 Maheen Rizvi as Maria Khan: Kashaf's university friend
 Shazia Afgan as Nigar Murtaza: Second wife of Murtaza
 Muhammad Asad as Hammad Murtaza: Nigar and Murtaza's son (Kashaf's half-brother)
 Kanwar Nafees as Farhan Zaid
 Khalid Ahmed as Wahab: Murtaza's elder brother

Soundtrack 

The Zindagi Gulzar Hai title song is sung by Ali Zafar and Hadiqa Kiani, composed by Shani Arshad with lyrics by Naseer Turabi.

Background music: Parts of the background music were taken from Hollywood films such as "The Adjustment Bureau", "Jarhead", and "Wall-E".

Release

Broadcast 
Zindagi Gulzar Hai was originally broadcast on Hum TV in December 2012. It was rebroadcast due to the viewers' interest in the 10:00pm slot. In December 2018, it was aired under the segment Hum Kahaniyan from Monday to Friday at 9:00 am on Hum TV. The show was also broadcast on Hum TV's sister channel Hum Sitaray in 2017 and will be broadcast on Hum Pashto 1 in Pashto as ژون گلزار دے.

Netflix 
Netflix launched Pakistani dramas and Zindagi Gulzar Hai was added to Netflix on 15 December 2015. It was holding 4 star rating. Currently it is removed from Netflix.

Reception

Television rating points (TRPs) 
Zindagi Gulzar Hai started off very well than averaging 6.4 TRPs but after the climax episode i.e. EP. 7, ratings increased dramatically averaging and topping the charts every week. Then after the marriage of the protagonists, ratings started to further increase and now Zindagi Gulzar Hai averages 6+ TRPs with 6.6 TRPs as maximum until now. But from 3 May 2013 Zindagi Gulzar Hai achieved 8.7 trp as declared by Hum TV. Many say that it will make a new record when its last episode will air. And it did by reaching a point till 9.5. It is the one of the highest-rated Pakistani television series. The drama received several awards, nine at the 2nd Hum Awards, three at the 4th Pakistan Media Awards and two awards at the 13th Lux Style Awards. The role of Sanam Saeed was appreciated by critics.

Awards and accolades

References

External links 
 

Urdu-language television shows
Hum TV original programming
Zee Zindagi original programming